Rahul Jakhar (born 1986) is an Indian Para Pistol Shooter. He is currently World No 8 in Men's 10m Air Pistol SH1 (World Shooting Para Sport Rankings) and he also participated in the 2018 Asian Para Games P4 - Mixed 50M Free Pistol (SH1 Events).

2020 Summer Paralympics 
He Qualify For Paralympics Games at Tokyo, Japan and now he will represent India Team at the Shooting Paralympic of the 2020 Summer Paralympics in Tokyo, Japan at Team Team.

See also
Paralympic Committee of India
 India at the Paralympics

References

1986 births
Living people
2020
Indian male sport shooters
Paralympic shooters of India
Shooting sports in India
Indian sportsmen
People from Haryana
Shooters at the 2020 Summer Paralympics
21st-century Indian people